The Diocese of Žilina is a Roman Catholic diocese in north-western Slovakia including  parts of the Trenčín and Žilina regions. It has its seat in Žilina. The current bishop is Tomáš Galis.

History 
The diocese was established on 14 February 2008 from the northern parts of the Diocese of Nitra, which shifted more to the south and from a small part of the Diocese of Banská Bystrica.

Today 

The newest activities in 2022 from the newly established Caplan, the Roman Catholic priest Michal Tichy, were connected to another willingness project—The Wikimedia Foundation's interests. The priest allowed Wikipedians, from the first point, to publish the edited record of his Holy Mass freely to the whole world. His own homilies were firstly recorded 18. April 2022 in consideration of the Evangelium of Mathew 28, 8–15.

Deaneries
The diocese currently has 12 deaneries in the towns:

External links
Official site of the diocese

Catholic Church in Slovakia
Roman Catholic dioceses in Slovakia
Žilina